Galagete griseonana is a moth in the family Autostichidae. It was described by Schmitz and Landry in 2005. It is found on the Galapagos Islands.

References

Moths described in 2005
Galagete